Te Wairepo / York Stream is a major tributary of the Maitai / Mahitahi River in Nelson, South Island, New Zealand. 

The Maori name Te Wairepo means "water running through a swamp". Before the valley was drained and houses built by early European settlers, stands of flax covered the low-lying areas through which Te Wairepo flowed.

Restoration of this, now largely urban, waterway has been a major focus of Project Maitai / Mahitahi, a Nelson City Council initiative to improve the health of the Maitai River and all its tributaries.

References

External links 

 Project Maitai / Mahitahi

Rivers of the Nelson Region
Rivers of New Zealand